Korlai Portuguese is an Indo-Portuguese creole based on the Portuguese language, spoken by approximately 1,000 inhabitants of the Korlai village at the Korlai fort, a former possession of the Portuguese in Goa and Bombay. Their speech is referred to as Korlai creole, Korlai Portuguese, Kristi or Nɔw-ling by the speakers themselves, which translates to "our language" in Portuguese. The speakers are a part of a very close-knit community, and refer to themselves as the Kristi community bound by their affiliation to the Christian denomination, of Roman Catholicism in India. Korlai is situated in the Raigad district (Colaba district) of the Konkan division named after the Colaba fort, 150 kilometers south of Mumbai (Bombay), in Maharashtra, India. The speakers are of a homogenous Roman Catholic pocket in an area otherwise dominated by Konkani Muslim and Hindu Marathi-Konkani speaking inhabitants.

Development of Korlai Creole Portuguese 

The development of the language can be traced back to the 1500s with the conception of the new element of society, the native Indian Catholics and Eurasian offspring. The existing caste system within India had a great influence on the creation of KCP (Korlai Creole Portuguese). The Eurasian offspring and the Indian-Eurasian offspring were isolated from the pure-blood Portuguese and other castes. This isolation led them to intermarry and children began learning the pidgin their parents spoke. The Korlai creole emerged among the slaves and their offspring who converted to Christianity and became a part of the Portuguese community while still adhering to existing caste distinctions.  The social isolation this community faced contributed to the maintenance and growth of Korlai creole.

In today's context, the Kristi community is geographically separated from the rest as the community lives in the 'varcha bhag' [Upper Korlai]. The community also differs from the rest of the area occupationally. Korlai Creole Portuguese speakers are agriculturists whereas the other dominant occupation is of fishers from the Koli, Mali, Agari and a few Maratha communities. Apart from the geographical and occupational differences, the Kristi community differentiates itself linguistically, by the use of 'nɔ ling', an important marker of their identity. However, with the changing times and better connectivity between Korlai and the rest of the world, the language evolving. The newer generation prefers the use of Marathi as it is dominant language of the state and the insistence of the Church in order to create unison. This is causing a huge influence of Marathi on the language and its development.

Socio-historical Background 
Chaul was an important trade city near Korlai and was first visited by the Portuguese in 1505. This area was previously under the Muslim rule from 1318. The Portuguese and the Muslim ruler maintained a friendly relation, however, the relation soon experienced tension and a war broke out. During this time 600 casados, i.e. Portuguese men married the native women who were living outside the Chaul fort along with a large number of Hindu and Muslim shopkeepers. In 1594, the Portuguese took over the fort along with Korlai in the valley of the marro (hill). By 1630, a small Christian community grew when the church, Nossa Senhora do Mar 'Our Lady of the Sea' was built on the hill. The slaves and the offspring of the casados [Portuguese men] and soldadas [Soldiers] were mainly Christian converts. The Portuguese abandoned Chaul and the hill to move to Goa in 1740. After the departure of the Portuguese, many Christians moved to other Portuguese territories while the Christians of the lower-castes moved closer to the church as the Marathas took control of the region.

Features of Korlai Creole Portuguese 
Korlai Portuguese vowels are similar to the Middle Portuguese, which was spoken by Portuguese soldiers that came to the region. The sole difference being the point of articulation of the central vowel. Both Marathi and Korlai Creole Portuguese had a decline in nasal vowels and this process of denasalisation is connected for both languages. In the younger generation, Korlai Creole Poruguese also shows an increase in the borrowing of Marathi lexical items. Clements indicated that the language had SVO word order but recent data shows the language now utilizes a SOV word order, which could be attributed to increased influence of Marathi.

Examples of Nɔ Ling 

Thanks a lot: Muit'obrigad! From Port. Muito Obrigado
I: yo; From Port. eu
You (singular): wo; From Port. vós
You (formal): usé; From Port. você
He and She: el; From Port. ele (he) and ela (she)
We: no; From Port. nós
You (plural): udzó; From Port. vós outros
They: eló; from Port. eles outros
Numerals: ũ, doy, tre, kwat, sink, sey, set, oyt, nob, dey; From Port. um, dois, três, quatro, cinco, seis, sete, oito, nove, dez
First, Second: Primer, Sigun; From Port. Primeiro, Segundo
How are you?: Use, kile te?
All are eating and drinking their fill: tud gent cumen beben tem fart; From Port. toda a gente come e bebe até fartar

Song of Korlai:

Portuguese translation:

English translation:

References 

Languages of India
Portuguese-based pidgins and creoles
Luso-Indian
Portuguese language in Asia